C Michael Armstrong (born October 18, 1938 in Detroit, Michigan) is an American business executive and former AT&T chairman and CEO. He was hired after Kenneth Lay turned down the job to continue managing Enron. He tried to reestablish AT&T as an end-to-end carrier but, due to the dot-com bust and various other issues, he was forced to break the group up in 2001. He resigned in 2002 and was succeeded by AT&T President David Dorman.

He is also the former CEO of Hughes Electronics, and Comcast Corporation.  He worked for IBM from 1961 to 1992.  He served as a Director of Citigroup from 1989 to 2010.  Armstrong is a member of the Alfalfa Club and the Council on Foreign Relations.  He received his BS in Business at Miami University in 1961.

In 2000 he was a board member of Citigroup and voted to oust former Citicorp CEO, John S. Reed, in favor of Sandy Weill who was co-CEO with Reed at the time. Influential analyst Jack Grubman wrote an upgraded favorable opinion of AT&T which was a reversal of Grubman's opinion just prior to that time.

References

External links
 C Michael Armstrong Bio at Reference for Business
 http://www.businessweek.com/2001/01_06/b3718151.htm
 

IBM employees
AT&T people
People
Miami University alumni
Dartmouth College alumni missing graduation year
Businesspeople from Detroit
1938 births
Living people
American chairpersons of corporations
American technology chief executives
American corporate directors
American telecommunications industry businesspeople
Tuck School of Business alumni

20th-century American businesspeople